Achintraid is a small one-time crofting township, situated at the north-eastern end of the sea loch Loch Kishorn, in Strathcarron, Ross-shire, Scottish Highlands and is in the Scottish council area of Highland.

References
The community website: Kishorn Online

Populated places in Ross and Cromarty